Catarina Guimarães (born February 19, 2004) is an American Paralympic athlete who competes in international track and field competitions. She is a double Parapan American Games bronze medalist.

As well as athletics training, Guimarães is the author of Death Garden fiction book series.

References

2004 births
Living people
People from Livingston, New Jersey
Paralympic track and field athletes of the United States
American female sprinters
American female long jumpers
Medalists at the 2019 Parapan American Games
American women non-fiction writers